Blizocin may refer to the following places in Poland:
Blizocin, Lower Silesian Voivodeship (south-west Poland)
Blizocin, Lublin Voivodeship (east Poland)